Otto Kivenmäki (born 24 March 2000) is a Finnish professional ice hockey player for Lahti Pelicans of the Finnish Liiga. He was drafted 191st overall by the Detroit Red Wings in the 2018 NHL Entry Draft.

Playing career
On 19 April 2018, Kivenmäki signed a three-year contract with Ässät of the Finnish SM-liiga. and made his professional debut for Ässät on 30 September 2018.

On 15 April 2021, Kivenmäki joined his second Liiga club, Lahti Pelicans, signing a two-year contract.

Personal life
Kivenmäki is the son of former professional ice hockey player Marko Kivenmäki.

Career statistics

References

External links
 

2000 births
Living people
Ässät players
Detroit Red Wings draft picks
Finnish ice hockey centres
Lahti Pelicans players
Sportspeople from Pori